The Arenal Prehistory Project was a multidisciplinary research effort taking place between 1984 and 1987 that uncovered evidence of human occupation from Paleoindian and Archaic times through four sedentary phases to the Spanish Conquest in the tropical rainforest of Northwest Costa Rica.

Introduction 

The Arenal Prehistory Project took place as the start of a larger, ongoing research effort in the area around Lake Arenal and Arenal Volcano in Guanacaste province, Costa Rica that has spanned from the early 1980s to the present day.  This particular area of Middle America was found to be especially suitable for archaeological study because its dominant geographical feature, the still-active Arenal Volcano, had erupted at least nine times in prehistory and provided for extraordinary site-preservation with stratified layers of tephra that facilitated the dating of uncovered discoveries.  Examination of the area affected by volcanic eruptions also allowed for further study of human adaptation to such events.

Primary disciplinary fields involved in the research project were archeology, botany, and volcanology.  Funding was primarily granted by the National Science Foundation and the National Geographic Society.  The Project's publishing researchers include Payson Sheets, Brian McKee, Marilynn Mueller, and Mark Chenault of the University of Colorado, John Hoopes of the University of Kansas, William Melson of the Smithsonian Institution, Tom Sever of Stennis Space Center, and John Bradley of San Juan College.

Research methods 
Excavation sites were chosen where a recently-dammed and expanded Lake Arenal had exposed artifacts on the shoreline, the three major sites out of 39 total being Tronadora Vieja (Costa Rica's earliest dated formative village), Bolivar, and Silencio.  The operation-lot system for field control was used in survey and excavation.  Volcanological study was able to determine the sequence of prehistoric eruptions of Arenal Volcano and corresponding tephra deposits.  When artifacts were found in association with these deposits, they could be independently dated using the predetermined sequence data as well as radiocarbon dating.  Over 12,000 potsherds were found and analyzed, with pre-existing pottery sequences from Middle America and Mesoamerica used for comparison.  Similarly, 8,755 chipped stone artifacts were found and analyzed, being classified in 18 different categories for comparison with those in existing databases.  Only 224 ground stone artifacts were found and analyzed.  Botanical remains (carbonized macrofossils, pollen, and phytoliths) were found and analyzed to profile the dietary habits of the region's previous inhabitants.  Remote-sensing imagery was also used, and revealed prehistoric footpaths used for human transportation, which were excavated in 38 places by the researchers during the study.

Findings 
The Arenal Prehistory Project succeeded in uncovering and examining archaeological evidence for human occupation in the Northwest Costa Rica research area spanning 5,500 years, from 4000 BC to the time of the Spanish Conquest.  It defined phases of occupation (see section below) that differ chronologically and in some technological and cultural aspects, but that are also, at their cores, remarkably similar given the numerous volcanic upheavals the area endured.  Researchers found villages to have been occupied continuously from 2000 BC up until the centuries before the arrival of the Europeans, and stone tools to have been made the same way all throughout the recorded period of occupation.  Compared to other Mesoamerican and Middle American populations, the Arenalan one was determined to have been incredibly self-sufficient (thanks in large part to the local availability of resources) and stable, having never experienced huge population increases or periods of dependence on a single agricultural staple.

Arenal phases of occupation

Notes

References 
 Sheets, Payson and Hoopes, John, et al. "Prehistory and Volcanism in the Arenal Area, Costa Rica." Journal of Field Archaeology. 18.4 (Winter, 1991): 445-465.
 Snead, James E. Landscapes of Movement: Trails, Paths, and Roads in Anthropological Perspective. Philadelphia: University of Pennsylvania Press, 2009. Print.
 Melson, William G. "Prehistoric Eruptions of Arenal Volcano, Costa Rica." Vinculos. 10 (1984) 35-59.

Archaeology of Costa Rica
Mesoamerican studies
Mesoamerican archaeology